The Tyranny of Distance: How Distance Shaped Australia's History is a history book by Australian historian Geoffrey Blainey.

History
First published in 1966, the book examines how Australia's geographical remoteness, particularly from Great Britain, has been central to shaping the country's history and identity and will continue to shape its future.  The long distance between Australia and the centre of the British Empire, along with the United States, made Australians unsure of their future economic prosperity.

The expression "the tyranny of distance" from the book's title has become common parlance in Australia. Although Blainey is widely credited with coining the term in his 1966 work, the term appeared five years previously in the geographic research of William Bunge. Bunge uses the term in quotation marks, indicating that the phrase may have had earlier usage.

Blainey writes about how the tyranny had been mostly surmounted and may have even worked in Australia's favour in some ways.

During the COVID-19 pandemic, a news article in the conservative magazine Quadrant cited the book in relation to how Australia's relative isolation from China's viral epicentre may have been favourable in containing the virus within Australia.

References

1966 non-fiction books
20th-century history books
Books about Australian history
Books by Geoffrey Blainey